Jack Hsu may refer to:

 Jack Hsu (artist), American artist
 Jack Hsu (politician), incumbent Political Deputy Minister of Transportation and Communications of the Republic of China